MIET may refer to:
Member of the Institution of Engineering and Technology

Organisations in Greece 
National Bank of Greece Cultural Foundation (transliteration: Morfotiko Idryma Ethnikis Trapezis)

Organisations in India 
Mahavir Institute of Engineering and Technology, Bhubaneswar, Orissa
Manoharbhai Patel Institute of Engineering and Technology, Shahapur/Gondia, Maharashtra
Model Institute of Engineering and Technology, Jammu, Jammu and Kashmir
Modern Institute of Engineering and Technology, Hooghly, West Bengal

Organisations in Russian Federation 
Moscow Institute of Electronic Technology (currently National Research University of Electronic Technology), Zelenograd, Moscow